Edward Thomas Te Whiu (27 February 1935 – 18 August 1955) was a notable New Zealand  criminal and murderer. Of Māori descent, he identified with the Nga Puhi iwi. He was born in Waipapakauri, Northland, New Zealand, in 1935. Te Whiu was hanged at Mount Eden Prison in August 1955, after he had killed Florence Smith, a 75-year-old widow, in Ngararatunua, near Kamo, when an attempted burglary went wrong.

Evidence was given that he had calmly cooked himself a meal in the next room to the corpse of his aged victim. The "completely non-adjusted a-social youth" went happily to his death. He took a cigarette an hour before the hanging, smiled and said, "won't it be wonderful to be in heaven where cigarettes can come flying through the air." One of his last requests was to have his religious comics thrown into his grave with him.

References

1935 births
1955 deaths
New Zealand people convicted of murder
People from the Northland Region
People executed by New Zealand by hanging
Ngāpuhi people
People convicted of murder by New Zealand
People executed for murder
Executed New Zealand people
20th-century executions by New Zealand
1955 murders in New Zealand
New Zealand Māori people